Julien Girard (born 5 July 1984 in Saint-Martin-d'Hères) is a French professional footballer. He currently plays in the Championnat de France amateur for SO Romorantin.

Girard played at the professional level in Ligue 2 for FC Gueugnon.

1984 births
Living people
French footballers
Ligue 2 players
FC Gueugnon players
AFC Compiègne players
SO Romorantin players
Association football forwards
People from Saint-Martin-d'Hères
Sportspeople from Isère
Footballers from Auvergne-Rhône-Alpes